Munro is a 1960 Czechoslovak-American animated short film directed by Gene Deitch, written by Jules Feiffer, and produced by William L. Snyder. Munro won an Oscar for Best Animated Short Film in 1961.  It was the first short composed outside of the United States to be so honored. The Academy Film Archive preserved Munro in 2004.

Plot 

The title character is a rebellious little boy who is accidentally drafted into the United States Army. No matter which adult he tells, "I'm only four", they all fail to notice his age. Eventually, the harshness of army life makes Munroe cry, which causes the general to realize that he really is a little boy. He is discharged and becomes a hero...and whenever he misbehaves, Munroe is reminded of his stint in the army.

Munro's voice is provided by Gene Deitch's young son Seth Deitch (later a writer and artist in his own right), while Deitch's wife Marie Deitch does the female voices.

Production 
Screenwriter Feiffer, who adapted his own story from his book Passionella and Other Stories, and provided the storyboards, said the tale was a reaction to his time serving in the U.S. Army:

References

External links 
 
 
 

1960 films
1960 animated films
1960s animated short films
1960s American animated films
Best Animated Short Academy Award winners
English-language Czech films
Czech animated films
Films about military personnel
Films about the United States Army
Films based on short fiction
Films directed by Gene Deitch
Military humor in film
Paramount Pictures short films
1960 short films
Rembrandt Films short films
Czech animated comedy films